Arava Shahaf (or Schahaf, ; born 28 April 1990) is an Israeli football forward, currently playing in the Israeli First League for F.C. Ramat HaSharon (on loan). Shahaf has been a member of the Israeli national team since 2013, when she made her debut against Malta.

Club career
Born in Be'er Sheva, Shahaf joined Maccabi Be'er Sheva at the age of 15, making her debut on 12 December 2006 against ASA Tel Aviv University. She played with the club until the beginning of the 2013–14 season, when she was loaned to F.C. Ramat HaSharon, to which she was loaned ever since. On 17 November 2015, in a match against her old club, Shahaf scored her 100th league goal.
Shahaf was also loaned for a brief period to ASA Tel Aviv University and played with the club in the 2014–15 Champions League qualifying round, getting sent off against Atlético Ouriense.

International career
Shahf made her international debut with the Israel women's national football team at the age of 23, in a match against Malta, and as of December 2015, played 10 matches for the national team. Shahaf also played a single match for the U-19 national team in 2007, in a 1–5 loss to Italy.

References

External links

Israeli Jews
1990 births
Living people
Israeli women's footballers
Israel women's international footballers
Maccabi Be'er Sheva F.C. (women) players
ASA Tel Aviv University players
F.C. Ramat HaSharon players
Women's association football forwards
Footballers from Beersheba